Ruth Kettlewell (born Ruth Anne Berry, 13 April 1913 – 17 July 2007) was an English actress. She was, by her own admission, a "character bag"; that is, a face recognisable to regular television viewers, but not a household name.

Early life
Kettlewell was born as the second daughter of a clergyman, and was educated at Casterton School and at art college. She married a curate, the Rev Robert Kettlewell, at the age of eighteen. Her husband died from the scarlet fever that he caught while serving as a wartime army padre. She herself served in the Women's Land Army from 1942 to 1946.

Career

Early career
After playing small parts in many amateur dramatic productions, Kettlewell began her career in repertory theatre at the Little Theatre, Great Yarmouth; first with Aurora Productions Limited and later with the Great Yarmouth Repertory Company. By the late 1950s, she had managed to secure small West End roles. In 1959, she had her first film role in Room at the Top. She also acted in Norwegian for a Scandinavian children's film.

TV and Radio breakthroughs
In the 1960s, Kettlewell's television career unfolded and she worked alongside the likes of Harry Worth, Joan Sims and Deryck Guyler. She is perhaps best known for her role in the early episodes of All Gas and Gaiters,  where she played Mrs Grace Pugh-Critchley, the Dean's wife. In 1966, she had a small role in the seminal Cathy Come Home.

A specialist in landladies and mothers-in-law, she was equally at home with both adult and children's material. In the early 1970s, she played alongside the Scottish comedy double-act Mike Hope and Albie Keen in BBC TV's Hope and Keens Crazy House, later reprised as Hope and Keen's Crazy Bus. Like many actors, she continued to work well into her eighties.

In her obituary, The Independent noted that "By her own admission ...Ruth Kettlewell often played battleaxes, but it kept her in regular work...for half a century, sometimes only in fleeting roles. A lifelong Christian, she even felt sympathy for those on the receiving end of her characters' stern actions."

Later life
A devout Anglo-Catholic and an active member of the Actors’ Church Union, she visited the shrine of Our Lady of Walsingham on numerous occasions. She directed many amateur productions with a devotional theme for her church, St Augustine of Canterbury, Highgate, where she also served as a churchwarden and a sacristan. She died on 17 July 2007 in London.

Filmography

Film
 Room at the Top (1959) - Thespians Member (uncredited)
 Friends and Neighbours (1959) - Woman in club
 Sons and Lovers (1960) - Mrs. Bonner
 Edgar Wallace Mysteries - (The Clue of the New Pin (1961 film)) - (1961) - Mrs. Rushby
 The Yellow Teddy Bears (1963) - Mrs. Seymour
 Oh! What a Lovely War (1969) - Duchess Sophie (uncredited)
 No Blade of Grass (1970) - Fat Woman
 Zeppelin (1971) - Mrs. Parker
 Professor Popper's Problem (1974) - Meter Maid
 Adventures of a Private Eye (1977) - Mrs. Grimpton
 The Black Panther (1977)
 Crystalstone (1987) - Dolores
 Great Balls of Fire! (1989) - Dowager
 Funny Bones (1995) - Camilla Powell

Television
 Swallows and Amazons (1963) as Mrs. Jackson
 All Gas and Gaiters (1966-1969) - Grace Pugh-Critchley / Mrs. Beems
 On the Buses (1970-1971) - the Nurse
 The Good Life (1975) - Woman
 The Howerd Confessions (1976) - the Magistrate
 Juliet Bravo (1980) - the Magistrate
 In Loving Memory (1980) - Big Madge Butley
 Don't Wait Up (1984) - Mrs Fletcher
 That's My Boy (1984) - Miss Falkender

References

1913 births
2007 deaths
Actors from Worcester, England
English Anglo-Catholics
English film actresses
English stage actresses
English television actresses